English Only, Please is a 2014 Filipino romantic comedy film directed by Dan Villegas and starring Jennylyn Mercado and Derek Ramsay. Produced by Quantum Films, in association with MJM Productions, Tuko Film Productions and Buchi Boy Films it is an official entry to the 40th Metro Manila Film Festival.

Plot 
Julian Parker (Derek Ramsay) comes to Manila from New York with one goal: to perfectly dictate a Filipino translation of his angry letter to his half-Pinay ex-girlfriend Megan with the help of the perky Filipino-English tutor he hired online. Tere Madlansacay (Jennylyn Mercado) is a top-notch Filipino-English tutor. She is strict and feisty and takes pride in teaching English and/or Filipino to more than 142 Americans, Fil-Ams, Koreans since 2006.

Cast

Main Cast
Jennylyn Mercado as Tere Madlansacay, a Filipino tutor from the Philippines
Derek Ramsay as Julian Parker, a Filipino-American from the States
Kean Cipriano as Rico, Tere's "gold-digging, on-and-off" boyfriend
Isabel "Lenlen" Frial as Kay-Kay, Mallows's witty daughter/Tere's goddaughter
Cai Cortez as Mallows, Tere's best friend
Jerald Napoles as "the manliligaw on the street"
Lynn Ynchausti-Cruz as Tere's mother
Ian de Leon as Tere's brother
Jervy "Patani" Daño as Tere's mare

Special Participation
Isabel Oli as Megan Montañer, Julian's ex-girlfriend
Tom Rodriguez as Ernest, Megan's fiancée
Meowfie as Jeepney Bystander

Awards 
40th Metro Manila Film Festival 2014
Best Picture: 2nd Place
Best Actor: Derek Ramsay
Best Actress: Jennylyn Mercado
Best Director: Dan Villegas
Best Story: Antoinette Jadaone and Dan Villegas
Best Screenplay: Antoinette Jadaone and Anj Pessumal
Best Editor: Marya Ignacio

References

External links

2014 films
Philippine romantic comedy films
2014 romantic comedy films